The 1991–92 NBA season was the Bucks' 24th season in the National Basketball Association. In the off-season, the Bucks signed free agent and former All-Star forward Moses Malone. After an 8–9 start to the season, head coach Del Harris resigned and was replaced with interim Frank Hamblen. Under Hamblen, the Bucks hovered around .500 for the first half of the season, holding a 22–24 record at the All-Star break. However, their glory days came to a crashing end losing 27 of 36 games after the All-Star break. The Bucks went on an 11-game losing streak as they lost 14 of their final 15 games, finishing last place in the Central Division with a 31–51 record, missing the playoffs for the first time since 1979. 

Malone averaged 15.6 points and 9.1 rebounds per game, while sixth man Dale Ellis led the team in scoring with 15.7 points per game off the bench, and Jay Humphries provided the team with 14.0 points, 6.6 assists and 1.7 steals per game. In addition, Alvin Robertson averaged 12.3 points, 4.4 assists and 2.6 steals per game, while Frank Brickowski provided with 11.4 points and 5.3 rebounds per game, Fred Roberts contributed 9.6 points per game, and Larry Krystkowiak averaged 9.0 points and 5.4 rebounds per game off the bench. 

Following the season, Ellis was traded to the San Antonio Spurs, while Humphries and Krystkowiak were both dealt to the Utah Jazz, Jeff Grayer signed as a free agent with the Golden State Warriors, and Hamblen was fired as head coach.

Draft picks

Roster

Regular season

Season standings

z - clinched division title
y - clinched division title
x - clinched playoff spot

Record vs. opponents

Game log

|- style="background:#bfb;"
| 1 || November 1, 1991 || @ Detroit
| W 109—99
|Dale Ellis (24)
|
|
| The Palace of Auburn Hills21,454
| 1–0
|- style="background:#bfb;"
| 2 || November 2, 1991 || Chicago
| W 109–107
|Alvin Robertson (29)
|Alvin Robertson (8)
|Jay Humphries (9)
| Bradley Center18,633
| 2–0
|- style="background:#fcc;"
| 3 || November 5, 1991 || @ New York
| L 85–113
|Dale Ellis, Jay Humphries (14)
|
|
| Madison Square Garden15,768
| 2-1
|- style="background:#fcc;"
| 4 || November 6, 1991 || Golden State
| L 114–120
|Jeff Grayer (27)
|
|
| Bradley Center14,591
| 2–2
|- style="background:#bfb;"
| 5 || November 8, 1991 || @ Charlotte
| W 125—122 OT
|Moses Malone (23)
|Brad Lohaus, Moses Malone (8)
|
| Charlotte Coliseum23,698
| 3–2
|- style="background:#bfb;"
| 6 || November 9, 1991 || Dallas
| W 111–95
|Jay Humphries (24)
|Moses Malone (11)
|
| Bradley Center15,175
| 4–2
|- style="background:#fcc;"
| 7 || November 11, 1991 || @ Philadelphia
| L 99–102
|
|
|
| The Spectrum12,132
| 4–3
|- style="background:#fcc;"
| 8 || November 12, 1991 || @ Cleveland
| L 113–119
|
|
|
| Richfield Coliseum14,267
| 4–4
|- style="background:#fcc;"
| 9 || November 15, 1991 || @ Chicago
| L 101–114
|
|
|
| Chicago Stadium18,686
| 4–5
|- style="background:#fcc;"
| 10 || November 16, 1991 || Miami
| L 116–120 OT
|
|
|
| Bradley Center15,621
| 4–6
|- style="background:#bfb;"
| 11 || November 19, 1991 || Charlotte
| W 127–104
|
|
|
| Bradley Center14,183
| 5–6
|- style="background:#bfb;"
| 12 || November 21, 1991 || Washington
| W 112–87
|
|
|
| Bradley Center14,671
| 6–6
|- style="background:#fcc;"
| 13 || November 23, 1991 || @ Golden State
| L 115–120
|
|
|
| Oakland–Alameda County Coliseum Arena15,025
| 6–7
|- style="background:#fcc;"
| 14 || November 24, 1991 || @ L. A. Lakers
| L 97–102
|
|
|
| Great Western Forum16,820
| 6–8
|- style="background:#fcc;"
| 15 || November 26, 1991 || @ Portland
| L 98–107 OT
|
|
|
| Memorial Coliseum12,888
| 6–9
|- style="background:#bfb;"
| 16 || November 30, 1991 || Indiana
| W 137–119
|
|
|
| Bradley Center14,623
| 7–9

|- style="background:#bfb;"
| 17 || December 3, 1991 || L. A. Lakers
| W 126–94
|
|
|
| Bradley Center17,739
| 8–9
|- style="background:#fcc;"
| 18 || December 5, 1991 || New Jersey
| L 101–109
|
|
|
| Bradley Center13,884
| 8–10
|- style="background:#fcc;"
| 19 || December 6, 1991 || @ Indiana
| L 106–126
|
|
|
| Market Square Arena10,132
| 8–11
|- style="background:#bfb;"
| 20 || December 8, 1991 || San Antonio
| W 102–83
|
|
|
| Bradley Center14,581
| 9–11
|- style="background:#fcc;"
| 21 || December 10, 1991 || @ Atlanta
| L 104—118
|
|
|
| The Omni10,093
| 9–12
|- style="background:#bfb;"
| 22 || December 12, 1991 || @ Washington
| W 104—97
|
|
|
| Capital Centre7,213
| 10–12
|- style="background:#bfb;"
| 23 || December 14, 1991 || Minnesota
| W 103–92
|
|
|
| Bradley Center14,911
| 11–12
|- style="background:#fcc;"
| 24 || December 18, 1991 || @ Boston
| L 117—131
|
|
|
| Boston Garden14,890
| 11–13
|- style="background:#bfb;"
| 25 || December 19, 1991 || @ Orlando
| W 95—87
|
|
|
| Orlando Arena15,151
| 12–13
|- style="background:#bfb;"
| 26 || December 21, 1991 || Philadelphia
| W 110–97
|
|
|
| Bradley Center15,191
| 13–13
|- style="background:#fcc;"
| 27 || December 26, 1991 || Cleveland
| L 94–111
|
|
|
| Bradley Center16,184
| 13–14
|- style="background:#bfb;"
| 28 || December 29, 1991 || Houston
| W 110–100
|
|
|
| Bradley Center15,191
| 14–14

|- style="background:#bfb;"
| 29 || January 2, 1992 || @ Minnesota
| W 92—91
|
|
|
| Target Center19,006
| 15–14
|- style="background:#bfb;"
| 30 || January 3, 1992 || Chicago
| W 113–109
|
|
|
| Bradley Center18,633
| 16–14
|- style="background:#bfb;"
| 31 || January 8, 1992 || Utah
| W 99–98
|
|
|
| Bradley Center15,406
| 17–14
|- style="background:#fcc;"
| 32 || January 10, 1992 || @ New Jersey
| L 97—104
|
|
|
| Brendan Byrne Arena9,230
| 17–15
|- style="background:#fcc;"
| 33 || January 11, 1992 || Sacramento
| L 105–106
|
|
|
| Bradley Center17,319
| 17–16
|- style="background:#fcc;"
| 34 || January 14, 1992 || @ Atlanta
| L 88—93
|
|
|
| The Omni9,390
| 17–17
|- style="background:#fcc;"
| 35 || January 15, 1992 || @ Miami
| L 115—134
|
|
|
| Miami Arena15,008
| 17–18
|- style="background:#bfb;"
| 36 || January 17, 1992 || New York
| W 90–85
|
|
|
| Bradley Center15,364
| 18–18
|- style="background:#bfb;"
| 37 || January 19, 1992 || Orlando
| W 108–98
|
|
|
| Bradley Center14,276
| 19–18
|- style="background:#fcc;"
| 38 || January 21, 1992 || @ Houston
| L 107—117
|
|
|
| The Summit12,989
| 19–19
|- style="background:#fcc;"
| 39 || January 22, 1992 || @ Dallas
| L 116—118
|
|
|
| Reunion Arena14,299
| 19–20

Player statistics

Awards and records

Transactions

Trades

Free agents

References

See also
 1991-92 NBA season

Milwaukee Bucks seasons
Milwaukee Bucks
Milwaukee Bucks
Milwaukee